Wilczyska  is a village in the administrative district of Gmina Bobowa, within Gorlice County, Lesser Poland Voivodeship, in southern Poland. It has a population of 860.

References

Wilczyska